The Piedraiaceae are a family of fungi in the Ascomycota, class Dothideomycetes.

References

Capnodiales
Dothideomycetes families